"Sadder Badder Cooler" (stylized in all lowercase) is a song by Swedish recording artist Tove Lo from the expanded edition of her fourth studio album Sunshine Kitty. The re-issue, dubbed the "Paw Prints Edition" was released on 22 May 2020. On the same day "Sadder Badder Cooler", the re-issue's opening track, was released as a single with two official remixes by The Presets and King Arthur.  Remixes by Banx & Ranx, MUTO, Y2K, and Liu followed on 17 July, 31 July, 7 August, and 4 September 2020 respectively. The song's music video, animated by Venturia Animation Studios and Dreambear Productions, depicts a cartoon Lo and her animal sidekick Sunshine Kitty "on a Kill Bill-style mission to take down several Disney princes.

Lo performed the song live at Billboard and The Hollywood Reporters "Pride Prom" on 13 June 2020 and on The Late Show with Stephen Colbert on 27 June 2020.

Track listing
Sadder Badder Cooler – The Presets Remix
"Sadder Badder Cooler" (The Presets Sunshine Remix) – 3:44
"Sadder Badder Cooler" (The Presets Midnight Remix) – 5:40

Sadder Badder Cooler – King Arthur Remix
"Sadder Badder Cooler" (King Arthur Remix) – 2:55

Sadder Badder Cooler – Banx & Ranx Remix
"Sadder Badder Cooler" (Banx & Ranx Remix) – 2:29

Sadder Badder Cooler – MUTO Remix
"Sadder Badder Cooler" (MUTO Remix) – 3:15

Sadder Badder Cooler – Y2K Remix
"Sadder Badder Cooler" (Y2K Remix) – 3:04

Sadder Badder Cooler – Liu Remix
"Sadder Badder Cooler" (Liu Remix) – 2:17

Personnel
Credits adapted from Tidal.
Tove Lo – songwriting, vocals
Elvira Anderfjärd – songwriting, production, background vocals, drums, electric bass, synthesizer, programming, vocal programming
Max Martin – songwriting
Michael Ilbert – mixing
Chris Gehringer – mastering engineer

Release history

Charts

References

2020 singles
2020 songs
Tove Lo songs
Songs written by Tove Lo
Songs written by Max Martin
Republic Records singles
Electropop songs